A slurry pump is a type of pump designed for pumping liquid containing solid particles. Slurry pumps changes in design and construction to adjust to multiple type of slurry which varies in concentration of solids, size of solid particles, shape of solid particles, and composition of solution. Slurry pump are more robust than liquid pumps; they have added sacrificial material and replaceable wear parts to withstand wear due to abrasion.

Centrifugal, positive displacement, and vortex pumps can be used for slurry. Centrifugal slurry pumps can have between bearing-supported shafts with split casing or rubber- or metal-lined casing.  Configurations include horizontal, vertical suspended and submersible.

Slurry is usually classified according to the concentration of solids. Engineering classification of slurry is more complex and involves concentration, particle size, shape and weight in order to determine abrasion severity. For engineering selection of slurry pumps, slurry is classified as class 1, class 2, class 3 and class 4.

Selection of slurry pumps is more difficult than selection of pumps for water and liquids. Many factors and corrections to the duty point affect brake horsepower and wear. Root-dynamic Centrifugal Slurry Pumps (ANSI/HI 12.1-12.6-2016) provides methods for calculation of slurry pumps. The peripheral speed of the impeller is one of the main features and classification of slurry pumps. Speed must be in accordance with the slurry type classification (abrasion classification) in order to maintain a reasonable life in service due to high abrasion of solids.

Before selecting an appropriate slurry pump the engineers considers capacity, head, solids handling capacity, efficiency and power, speed and NPSH.

Slurry pumps are widely used in transport of abrasive solids in industries such as mining, dredging, and steel.  They are often designed to be suitable for heavy-wearing and heavy-duty uses. Depending on the mining process, some slurries are corrosive which presents a challenge because corrosion-resistant materials like stainless steel are softer than high-iron steel. The most common metal alloy used to build slurry pumps is known as "high chrome", which is basically white iron with 25% chromium added to make it less brittle. Rubber line casings are also used for certain application where the solid particles are small.

Components 
 Impeller The impeller, either elastomer, stainless steel or high-chrome material, is the main rotating component which normally has vanes to impart the centrifugal force to the liquid.

 Casing Split outer casing halves of cast contain the wear liners and provide high operation pressure capabilities. The casing shape is generally of semi-volute or concentric, efficiencies of which are less than that of the volute type.

 Shaft and Bearing Assembly A large diameter shaft with a short overhang minimizes deflection and vibration. Heavy-duty roller bearing are housed in a removable bearing cartridge.

 Shaft sleeve A hardened, heavy-duty corrosion-resistant sleeve with O-ring seals at both ends protects the shaft. A split fit allows the sleeve removed or installed quickly.

 Shaft Seal Expeller drive seal, Packing seal, Mechanical seal.

 Drive Type V-belt drive, gear reducer drive, fluid coupling drive, and frequency conversion drive devices.

Types 
 SubmersibleSubmersible slurry pumps are placed at the bottom of a tank, lagoon, pond, or another water-filled environment, and suction solids and liquids right at the pump itself. The materials are taken in at the intake and passed through a hose connected to the discharge valve.

 Self-PrimingA self-priming slurry pump is operated from land, and a hose is connected to the pump's intake valve. The self-priming pump draws the slurry to the pump then discharges the material from there.

 Flooded SuctionThe flooded suction slurry pump is connected to a tank or hopper and uses gravity to move slurry and liquid from the enclosure. Located at the bottom or below the water, the pump uses the force of gravity to continuously fill the pump and then passes the material out through the discharge valve.

Pumps